Jowharan (also Romanized as Jowharān; also known as Joharānjey) is a village in Jey Rural District, in the Central District of Isfahan County, Isfahan Province, Iran. At the 2006 census, its population was 253, in 65 families.

References 

Populated places in Isfahan County